Semyon Abramovich Turovsky (Russian, Семён Абрамович Туровский; 1895 – July 1, 1937) was a Soviet corps commander. He was born in what is now Chernihiv, Chernihiv Oblast in northern Ukraine. He fought for the Bolsheviks against the White movement during the Russian Civil War. During the Great Purge, he was denounced by Dmitry Shmidt as being a member of a Trotskyite conspiracy. He was arrested on September 4, 1936 and executed the following year. He was a recipient of the Order of the Red Banner.

References 
 
 Краснознамённый Киевский. Очерки истории Краснознамённого Киевского военного округа (1919—1979). Издание второе, исправленное и дополненное. Киев, издательство политической литературы Украины. 1979. С.14 — 28.

External links 
 Комкоры. п.58. Туровский Семён Абрамович
 Кавалерийская дивизия 14-й армии, с 4.12.19 г. — 8-я кавалерийская дивизия Червонного казачества, с 6.05.22 г. — 1-я кавалерийская Запорожская Червонного казачества Краснознаменная дивизия имени Французской компартии.
 Кавалерия гражданской войны. Командный состав кавалерийских соединений и объединений. 8-я кавалерийская дивизия Червонного казачества.
 5с П Р И К А З НАРОДНОГО КОМИССАРА ОБОРОНЫ СОЮЗА ССР ПО ЛИЧНОМУ СОСТАВУ АРМИИ от 20 ноября 1935 года. № 2395. П.46 ТУРОВСКИЙ Семён Абрамович.
 «Вместе с Троцким». Семён Абрамович ТУРОВСКИЙ.
 Генеалогически форум еврейские корни. Scool 20 апр 2011, 15:57
 Генеалогически форум еврейские корни. Scool 24 апр 2011, 19:33
 Списки жертв — Мемориал. Туровский Семён Абрамович. Источник: База данных о жертвах репрессий Харьковской обл. (Украина)

1895 births
1937 deaths
People from Chernihiv
People from Chernigov Governorate
Soviet komkors
Recipients of the Order of the Red Banner
Great Purge victims from Ukraine
People executed by the Soviet Union